Djambi Residency was an administrative territorial entity of the Dutch East Indies and was established in 1906.

List of residents
Source:

See also
 Jambi

References

Residencies of the Dutch East Indies